KSE may mean:

 Karachi Stock Exchange, now Pakistan Stock Exchange
 Kuwait Stock Exchange
 Korea Stock Exchange
 Kyiv School of Economics
 Kroenke Sports & Entertainment
 Killswitch Engage, an American heavy metal band